Proto-Sphera is an Italian experiment to develop a spherical fusion reactor using a plasma to replace the usual central column. The device used is the repurposed Small Tight Aspect Ratio Tokamak

References

External links 
 The PROTO-SPHERA experiment, an innovative confinement scheme for Fusion
 Progress and Plans of the Proto-Sphera Program

Tokamaks
Science and technology in Italy